Saughall was a railway station on the former Chester & Connah's Quay Railway between Chester Northgate and Hawarden Bridge. Although it was named for the village, it was actually in Flintshire, Wales.

History

The station opened on 31 March 1890 by the Manchester, Sheffield and Lincolnshire Railway (which was renamed Great Central Railway in 1897). The station had a building with two adjacent side platforms and two goods sidings. The signal box had a 21-lever frame and closed on 21 July 1957.

From this station, services from North Wales could stop at Chester Northgate, the Chester terminus of the Cheshire Lines Committee, or continue on the line through Northwich to Manchester Central.

Passenger and freight services ceased on 1 February 1954 when the station was completely closed.

Even though steelmaking operations at the Corus plant at Shotton ceased in March 1980, freight continued to pass the former station on a double-tracked line until 20 April 1984. Goods services resumed on a single-track line on 31 August 1986 before final closure in 1992. The trackbed is now a cycle way.

The station has now been completely demolished.

Services

References

Sources

External links
 Images of the line in its final operating days

Disused railway stations in Flintshire
Former Great Central Railway stations
Railway stations in Great Britain opened in 1890
Railway stations in Great Britain closed in 1954